Jennifer Johnson Cano is an American operatic mezzo-soprano. Before her college education, she attended St. Pius X High School (Festus, Missouri), graduating in the Class of 2002. While in high school, she was a member of the choir, singing at Mass and state competitions. She earned a Bachelor of Music degree from Webster University and a Master of Music degree from Rice University where she was a pupil of Kathleen Kaun. In 2008 she won the Metropolitan Opera National Council Auditions, and in 2009 she won the Young Concert Artists competition and was the recipient of a Sullivan Foundation grant. She was a member of the Metropolitan Opera's Lindemann Young Artist Development Program.

In 2008 Cano made her professional opera debut with the Opera Theatre of Saint Louis as The
Muse/Nicklausse in Jacques Offenbach's The Tales of Hoffmann. In 2009 she made her debut at the Chicago Opera Theater as Kate Julian in Benjamin Britten's Owen Wingrave, and made her debut at the Met as one of the Bridesmaids in Mozart's The Marriage of Figaro. She has since returned to the Met as the Sandman in Engelbert Humperdinck's Hänsel und Gretel, Wellgunde in Das Rheingold and Götterdämmerung, Kate Pinkerton in Madama Butterfly, and Ludmila in The Bartered Bride in three performances presented by The Metropolitan Opera's Lindemann Young Artist Development Program in partnership with the Ellen and James S. Marcus Institute for Vocal Arts at the Juilliard School.

Cano was born in Saint Louis, is married to the pianist Christopher Cano and lives in New York City.

References

Living people
American operatic mezzo-sopranos
Rice University alumni
Webster University alumni
Musicians from St. Louis
Winners of the Metropolitan Opera National Council Auditions
21st-century American women opera singers
Singers from Missouri
Year of birth missing (living people)
Classical musicians from Missouri